The Marion Indians were a minor league baseball team based in Marion, Illinois. In 1947 and 1948, the Indians were charter members of the Class D level Illinois State League, which evolved into today's Midwest League. Hosting home games at Marion City Park, the Marion Indians were a minor league affiliate of the Cleveland Indians in 1947.

History
Minor league baseball began in Marion, Illinois in 1947. The Marion Indians franchise was formed and the team joined the Belleville Stags, Centralia Cubs, Mattoon Indians, Mount Vernon Blues, and West Frankfort Cardinals as new franchises and charter members of the Illinois State League.

An Illinois State League franchise was originally awarded to the city of Murphysboro, Illinois. The Murphysboro franchise moved to Marion, Illinois shortly before Illinois State League play began. The Marion Indians were formed as a minor league affiliate of the Cleveland Indians.

In their first season of play, the Illinois State League played a split–season schedule. The Marion Indians placed third in the 1947 overall Illinois State League final standings. With record of 55–56, playing the season under manager Melvin Ivy, the Indians finished 19.5 games behind the champion Belleville Stags. Marion placed fourth in the first–half standings with a 22–30 record and second in the second–half standings with a 33–26 record. Belleville won both half seasons and no playoffs were held as a result.

The Marion Indians played their final season in 1948 and qualified for the playoffs. Marion again placed third in the 1948 Illinois State League, with a 53–56 regular season record. In the final standings, Marion finished 31.5 games behind the first place West Frankfort Cardinals, with Melvin Ivy returning as manager. In the first round of the playoffs, the West Frankfort Cardinals defeated Marion 3 games to 1

After the 1948 season, the franchise relocated. The Marion franchise moved to Paducah, Kentucky to become the Paducah Chiefs in 1949. After the Marion relocation into the State of Kentucky, the Illinois State League changed its name to the Mississippi–Ohio Valley League in 1949. The Mississippi–Ohio Valley League became known as the Midwest League in 1956.

In 2007, the Southern Illinois Miners became members of the Independent level Frontier League and became the first professional team hosted in Marion since the Indians relocated in 1948, a span of 59 seasons.

The ballpark
The Marion Indians were noted to have played minor league home games at Marion City Park. Still in use today, the park is known as Ray Fosse Park, after Marion native and All-Star catcher Ray Fosse. The park has ballfields, a golf course and a municipal swimming pool. Ray Fosse Park is located at 500 East Deyoung Street, Marion, Illinois.

Timeline

Year–by–year records

Notable alumni
Roy Hawes (1947)

See also
Marion Indians players

References

External links
Stats Crew

Defunct Midwest League teams
Illinois State League
Marion, Illinois
Defunct minor league baseball teams
Sports clubs established in 1947
Sports clubs disestablished in 1948
1947 establishments in Illinois
1948 disestablishments in Illinois
Defunct baseball teams in Illinois
Professional baseball teams in Illinois
Baseball teams established in 1947
Baseball teams disestablished in 1948
Cleveland Guardians minor league affiliates
Illinois State League teams